General Belgrano is a town in Buenos Aires Province, Argentina. It is the administrative seat of General Belgrano Partido.  The provincial subdivision has a population of about 16,000 inhabitants in an area of 1,843 km2 (712 sq mi), and General Belgrano,  which is located 162 km (101 mi) from Buenos Aires, is considered to be its capital city.

Notable people
 

Leandro Testa (born 1976), former footballer

References

External links

 City website

Populated places in Buenos Aires Province
Populated places established in 1891
1891 establishments in Argentina